Melvin Scott (born February 3, 1982) is a former North Carolina Tar Heels men's basketball guard. He played on the 2004-2005 National Championship Team. He played all four eligible years and was not drafted by the NBA. He played high school basketball at Southern High in Baltimore. He played with KR Basket in Iceland's Úrvalsdeild.

Career
Scott was signed by KR-b, KR reserve team, in January 2006 ahead of its upcoming game against Grindavík in the Icelandic Cup. In the game, he scored 42 points in KR-B's 69-92 loss. Three weeks later, Scott was signed by KR's main team for the rest of the Úrvalsdeild karla season in place of Omari Westley, who was released after he was suspended for four games by the league. He helped KR to the semi-finals of the Úrvalsdeild playoffs where they bowed out to Njarðvík in four games, 3-1.

In 2017, Scott was hired as the Director of Basketball Operations at Tennessee Tech.

References

External links
 Melvin Scott at kki.is
 Profile at Eurobasket.com

1982 births
Living people
American expatriate basketball people in Germany
American expatriate basketball people in Iceland
American men's basketball players
Austin Toros players
Basketball Löwen Braunschweig players
Basketball players from Baltimore
Guards (basketball)
KR men's basketball players
North Carolina Tar Heels men's basketball players
Úrvalsdeild karla (basketball) players